The year 1586 in science and technology included a number of events, some of which are listed here.

Astronomy
 The last time Mercury and Venus transit the sun at the same time.

Botany
 Jacques Daléchamps publishes Historia generalis plantarum in Lyon, describing 2,731 plants, a record number for this time.

Cryptography
 Blaise de Vigenère publishes Traicté des chiffres ou secretes manières d'escrire in Paris, describing an autokey cipher of his invention.

Exploration
 July 21 – Thomas Cavendish sets out from Plymouth in the Desire on the first deliberately planned circumnavigation.

Mathematics
 Francesco Barozzi publishes Admirandum illud geometricum problema tredecim modis demonstratum quod docet duas lineas in eodem plano designare, a treatise on the construction of parallel lines.

Medicine
 Timothy Bright publishes A Treatise of Melancholie; containing the causes thereof, & reasons of the strange effects it worketh in our minds and bodies: with the  cure, and spirituall consolation... in London.

Physics
 Galileo publishes La Billancetta, describing an accurate balance to weigh objects in air or water.
 Simon Stevin publishes De Beghinselen der Weeghconst in Leiden, discussing static forces; and De Beghinselen des Waterwichts, discussing the weight of water.

Births
 February 26 – Niccolò Cabeo, Italian polymath (died 1650)
 December 6 – Niccolò Zucchi, Italian astronomer (died 1670)
 John Mason, English explorer (died 1635)
 Giovanni de Galliano Pieroni, Italian military engineer and astronomer (died 1654)
 approx. date – Guy de La Brosse, French physician and botanist (died 1641)

Deaths
 January 9 – Paul Wittich, German astronomer and mathematician (born c. 1546)
 January 22 - Louis Duret, French physician (born 1527)
 May 29 – Adam Lonicer, German botanist (born 1528)
 June 1 − Martín de Azpilcueta, Spanish theologian and economist (born 1491)
 October 19 – Ignazio Danti, Italian mathematician and astronomer (born 1536)

References

 
16th century in science
1580s in science